"Te Dejo Libre" (I Leave You Free) is a single by Salvadoran singer Álvaro Torres released on 1992 through EMI Latin as part of Torres' tenth studio album Nada Se Compara Contigo. The song was written by Torres, produced by Enrique Elizondo and it was recorded in Santa Fe Recording Studios, Van Nuys, California 

The song was a success in Latin America and the United States, peaking at number 4 in May 1993 on the Billboard Hot Latin Tracks chart. It was recognized as one of the best-performing songs of the year at the 1994 BMI Latin Awards.

Personnel 
Credits adapted from Nada Se Compara Contigo liner notes.

 Álvaro Torres – lead vocals, composing
 Chuck Anderson – arrangements
 Daniel Ash – composing
 Kevin Haskins – composing
 David J – composing

Production

Enrique Elizondo – production
Bob Biles – engineering
Chris Morrison – engineering assistance

Recording

 Recorded at Santa Fe Recording Studios, Van Nuys, California

Charts

Weekly charts

Year-end charts

References

External links
Lyrics of this song at Musixmatch

1992 songs
1992 singles
Songs written by Álvaro Torres
Spanish-language songs
EMI Latin singles
1990s ballads
Pop ballads
Rock ballads
Álvaro Torres songs